Notable people who live or have lived in Gainesville, Florida include:

Individuals

Musicians
 Charles Bradley, singer
 Beverly Crawford, gospel singer-songwriter
 Tay Dizm, musician
 Don Felder, musician
 Laura Jane Grace, lead singer and songwriter of Against Me!
 Gladys Horton, singer for The Marvelettes
 Timothy Kirkpatrick, drummer
 Bernie Leadon, musician
 Stan Lynch, musician
 Linda Lyndell, singer
 Vivek Maddala, musician, composer
 Marce, musician
 Jeremy McKinnon, singer-songwriter
 Damien Moyal, singer
 Tom Petty, musician
 Chuck Ragan, singer-songwriter
 Minnie Riperton, musician
 Joseph Simmons, musician
 Kaleb Stewart, singer-songwriter
 Stephen Stills, musician
 Benmont Tench, musician
 John Vanderslice, musician
 Chris Wollard, singer-songwriter, musician

Actors, performers
 Merritt Butrick, actor
 Casey Calvert, actress
 Brittany Daniel, actress
 Cynthia Daniel, actress
 Malcolm Gets
 Darrell Hammond, comedian
 Robert Hoffman, actor
 Tom Miller, performance artist
 Joaquin Phoenix, actor
 River Phoenix, actor
 Stephen Root, actor
 Maya Rudolph, actress, comedian
 Tyra Sanchez, drag queen, reality television personality
 Thomas Sanders, actor, singer and Vine & YouTube comedian

Athletes

 Kenny Bynum, football player (San Diego Chargers)
 Lyubov Denisova, marathon runner
 Doug Dickey, football coach, Hall of Fame member (University of Florida, University of Tennessee)
 Taurean Green, basketball player, NBA (Denver Nuggets)
Nigel Harris, football player (Tampa Bay Buccaneers)
Udonis Haslem, basketball player, NBA (Miami Heat)
 Clay Helton, football head coach, University of Southern California
 Al Horford, basketball player, NBA (Boston Celtics)
 Darrell Jackson, football player, NFL (Seattle Seahawks, San Francisco 49ers)
 Chris Leak, football player, NFL (Chicago Bears)
 Marty Liquori, Olympic track athlete, TV announcer, jazz guitarist
 Ryan Lochte, Olympic swimmer
 Roger Maris, baseball player (Kansas City Athletics, New York Yankees)
 Vernon Maxwell, basketball player (Houston Rockets)
 Andrew Miller, baseball player (Detroit Tigers)
 Heather Mitts, soccer player (United States women's national soccer team)
 Rodney Mullen, professional skateboarder
 Clinton Portis, football player, NFL (Denver Broncos, Washington Redskins)
 Chris Richard, basketball player, NBA (Minnesota Timberwolves)
 Ian Scott, professional football player, NFL (Chicago Bears, Philadelphia Eagles, Carolina Panthers, San Diego Chargers)
 Emmitt Smith, professional football player, NFL (Dallas Cowboys, Arizona Cardinals)
 Steve Spurrier, football player and coach (University of Florida, Washington Redskins, and University of South Carolina)
Steve Tannen, NFL defensive back with the New York Jets (1970, first round pick)
 Tim Tebow, professional football player, NFL (Denver Broncos, New York Jets, New England Patriots)
 Chris Thompson, football player
 Abby Wambach, soccer player, United States women's national soccer team
Scottie Wilbekin (born 1993), Turkish-American basketball player (Israeli Basketball Premier League)
 Bernard Williams, sprinter and Olympic gold medalist
 Jordan Williams, NFL player (New York Giants)

Writers
 Joel Achenbach, newspaper staff writer and book author
 Kiki Carter, environmental activist, organizer, musician, writer
 Harry Crews, Southern Gothic author
 Mike Dupee, author of How to Get on Jeopardy! and Win
 Nancy Yi Fan, children's book author
 Joe Haldeman, science fiction author
Rebecca Heflin, romance novelist
Andrew Knowlton, food writer
 David Leavitt, author, editor, and English professor at UF
 Tom Meek, newspaper columnist and writer
 Ange Mlinko, poet, critic, editor, and tenured poetry professor at UF

Other notable individuals
 Christopher Benninger, American Indian architect who grew up in Gainesville
 Robert Cade, inventor of Gatorade
 Scott Camil, activist
 David A. Christian, retired United States Army captain and former candidate for the Republican nomination in the 2012 United States Senate election in Pennsylvania
 Jamie Dupree, radio news reporter and Washington correspondent
 Terry Jones, gained national and international attention in 2010 for his plan to burn Qur'ans
 William R. Maples, forensic anthropologist
 Dustin Moskovitz, co-founder of Facebook and Asana
 Charles R. Perry, philanthropist and businessman
 Maggie Taylor, artist
 John Thompson, mathematician, Fields medalist
 Jerry Uelsmann, fine art photographer
 Anthony James Barr, programming language designer (SAS (software)), software engineer, inventor, and businessman
 Blake R. Van Leer, university president, dean of University of Florida, inventor, civil rights advocate

Music groups
 Against Me!
 Aleka's Attic
 As Friends Rust
 Cyne
 Damien Done
 The Draft
 For Squirrels 
 Holopaw
 Hot Water Music
 Less Than Jake
 Mudcrutch
 Rehasher
 Sister Hazel

References

Gainesville, Florida
Gainesville